The New Hampshire Rail Transit Authority (NHRTA) was a short lived administrative agency attached to the New Hampshire Department of Transportation (NHDOT) which was created in 2007 to oversee the development of commuter rail and other passenger rail service in New Hampshire. The agency would prove to be extraneous; constant political opposition and funding issues would hamper all NHRTA rail projects. By 2019 the group had ceased to meet, and their website URL had lapsed. Since then, the NHDOT has overseen all rail projects within the state.

Capitol Corridor
The initial focus of the NHRTA has been on the proposed Capitol Corridor, which would connect Concord, New Hampshire, with Boston, Massachusetts, via Manchester and Nashua and the existing MBTA Commuter Rail Lowell Line, and would also include a stop at Manchester-Boston Regional Airport.  The route would also be shared with a possible future high-speed rail line connecting Montreal and Boston. In October 2010, the NHRTA received grants in the amount of $2.24 million from the Federal Railroad Administration and $1.9 million from the Federal Transit Administration to study and plan the Capitol Corridor, marking the first time that the two federal agencies committed to work jointly on a planning grant. After the all-Republican Executive Council voted 3-2 against the rail feasibility study in 2012, the newly Democratic-led Council voted 4-1 to go forward with a $3.9 million New Hampshire Capitol Corridor Rail and Transit Alternatives Analysis on February 6, 2013.

At a public forum on March 5, 2014, the NHRTA presented preliminary results of the Capitol Corridor Rail and Transit Alternatives Analysis.  Included in the presentation was the projection of up to 3,100 daily riders on the Capitol Corridor commuter or intercity rail line, which would mean that the line could top 800,000 passengers annually, compared to 560,000 on Amtrak's popular Downeaster. URS Corporation, the consultant conducting the study, predicted significantly lower ridership for an enhance bus-on-shoulder service, at 1,200 passengers daily. Costs for the bus service would be lower than for rail, but there would be substantially less economic development, according to the preliminary results. Annual operating costs for the rail option on the Capitol Corridor would be in the range of $8–10 million. The NHRTA identified various possible revenue streams, including public-private partnerships, to cover future operating costs. Rail service was projected to begin as early as 2020. Despite this, the project was never funded or approved. The Capital Corridor has since been considered on multiple occasions; however, planning has not progressed beyond conceptual studies.

Other projects 
Additional current projects of the NHRTA include the possible extension of the Haverhill MBTA Commuter Rail line to Plaistow, New Hampshire along the Coastal Corridor. Possible longer term projects include assessing the need and desire for passenger rail service elsewhere in the state, and updating the state Rail Plan with a vision for restored and improved passenger and freight rail service throughout New Hampshire and connecting to neighboring states. In April 2015, the Plaistow Board of Selectmen voted for the "no build" option to not extend commuter rail; this decision would preclude all future passenger rail extensions to the town.

Support 
The Granite State Poll, conducted by the UNH Survey Center from January 27-February 6, 2011, showed overwhelming support for the Capital Corridor project generally, and strong support from all areas of the state and across all political parties and ideologies.  There is also strong support for the project among the business community in Nashua and Manchester, including the respective chambers of commerce and New Hampshire Businesses for Transportation and Infrastructure.  Local elected officials of both parties have also expressed support for the project, including supportive resolutions by the town councils of Bedford and Merrimack, both largely Republican communities, and the Nashua Board of Aldermen.

2011 legislative repeal attempt 
Following the 2010 election, some members of the New Hampshire General Court (the state legislature) began efforts to repeal the NHRTA.  The new Republican majority in the House passed HB 218, an act to repeal the NHRTA, by a vote of 190-119 in March 2011.  Following a promised veto by Governor John Lynch, a Democrat, and a committee recommendation to kill the bill, the Senate passed an amended version of HB 218 in May 2011.  The amended bill would maintain the NHRTA, but drastically reduce its responsibilities and powers.  Following a House vote to concur with the bill as amended by the Senate, Gov. Lynch vetoed HB 218 on June 15, 2011, citing support for the project from community and business leaders and the economic development that the project would generate. On January 4, 2012, the Governor's veto was sustained.

See also 
 Commuter rail in North America (commuter rail systems by ridership)
 List of MBTA Commuter Rail stations
 List of rail transit systems in North America
 Light rail in North America
 North–South Rail Link, a two-mile tunnel to more easily allow the Amtrak Acela to extend from Washington, D.C. to northern New England states of New Hampshire or Maine
 Transit-oriented development

References

External links 
NHRTA official webpage

Transportation in New Hampshire
Passenger rail transportation in New Hampshire
Transportation in New England
MBTA Commuter Rail